Dives is a genus of Neotropical birds in the family Icteridae.

The melodious blackbird lives in Mexico and Central America; the scrub blackbird in Ecuador and Peru.

The three species look similar, with plumage ranging from brownish black in juveniles to black with iridescence (green, blue, or violet) in adults, slightly more iridescent in males.  The bare parts are black and the eyes are dark brown.  The upper edge of the bill (the culmen) is curved, not flattened as in many other icterids, and the bill has a slight hook at the tip.  The songs are varied and pleasant.  If the ranges of the melodious blackbird and the northern populations of the scrub blackbird overlapped, they would be indistinguishable in the field apart from voice, and some authorities lump these two species into one; on the other hand some split the scrub blackbird into two species.

All three live in open habitats, including agricultural land, and have adapted well to human disturbance.

This genus is believed to be most closely related to Euphagus and Quiscalus.

Species
It contains three species:

References

 
 Peterson, Alan P. (Editor). 1999. Zoological Nomenclature Resource (Zoonomen). Accessed 2007-07-29.

 
American blackbirds
Bird genera